Wilcher is a surname shared by several notable people:

 Geneice Wilcher (born 1980), American beauty pageant titlist
 Mike Wilcher (born 1960), retired American professional football player
 Phillip Wilcher (born 1958), Australian pianist and composer
 Thomas Wilcher (living), American collegiate and pre-collegiate champion track and field athlete